The Battle of Zitlala was a battle of the War of Mexican Independence that occurred on 4 July 1812 on the outskirts of Zitlala, Guerrero. The battle was fought between the royalist forces loyal to the Spanish crown, and the Mexican rebels fighting for independence from the Spanish Empire. The battle resulted in a victory for the Mexican rebels.

Context 
When José María Morelos was advancing on the capital of Oaxaca, he routed a Spanish loyalist force at Zitlala, Guerrero. After his escape from the 72-day siege at Cuautla, Morelos joined his army together with 800 men under the command of Hermenegildo Galeana and Miguel Bravo at Chiautla. He then moved to march against the loyalist commander General José María Añorve de Salas at Chilapa de Álvarez followed by General Cerro at Tixtla de Guerrero. The regional Mexican commander, Juan Francisco París, did not move to further defend these towns as his army was occupied defending Ayutla de los Libres.

General Cerro, knowing that :es:Máximo BravoMáximo Bravo was marching with soldiers from Chilpancingo de los Bravo, decided to attack him at Tixtla de Guerrero and informed Añorve de Salas of his plans to that end. As Bravo marched towards Chilpancingo, he received news that Morelos was in the area around the Tlacesoutitlan River and that royalist forces under the command of Julián Ayala Larrazábal were marching towards Petaquillas.

The battle
After being informed of these developments, Añorve de Salas ordered Cerro to join his forces, however, a party of 50 men who apparently did not receive the orders or who had not yet begun their maneuvers  to join the main Spanish force, were in the town of Zitlala when an insurgent force under the command of Hermenegildo Galeana arrived and gave battle. The insurgents advanced on the town in two sections and eventually were successful in obliging the loyalist forces, who were on horseback, to retreat. The retreating Spanish forces left behind weapons and prisoners which were then taken to Zacatula.

See also 
 Mexican War of Independence

References

Bibliography 
 

]

Zitlala
Zitlala
History of Guerrero
Zitlala
Zitlala
1812 in New Spain
July 1812 events